This is a list of diplomatic missions of Nicaragua, excluding honorary consulates.

Africa

Americas

Asia

Europe

Multilateral organizations

Gallery

Closed missions

 Belmopan (Embassy) — closed in 2021

 New Delhi (Embassy) — closed in 2022

 Dakar (Embassy) — closed in 2021

 Taipei (Embassy) — closed in 2021

See also
 Ambassadors of Nicaragua
 Foreign relations of Nicaragua
 List of diplomatic missions in Nicaragua

References

External links
Ministry of External Affairs of the Republic of Nicaragua (Spanish)
 (Spanish)

Nicaragua
Diplomatic missions